Alappmoen or Alapmoen is a small farming village in Målselv Municipality in Troms og Finnmark county, Norway.

The location of Alappmoen is unusual since it a small cluster of farming fields in the middle of a forest in Northern Norway which is unlike most other communities in Norway, since they are located near the ocean or along a river.  The little farms of Rolvsjord, Skog, Frostad, and Renmelmoen are included in the village area.

References

External links
Gule Sider aerial view

Målselv
Populated places of Arctic Norway
Villages in Troms